The 1998–99 Idaho Vandals men's basketball team represented the University of Idaho during the 1998–99 NCAA Division I men's basketball season. Members of the Big West Conference, the Vandals were led by second-year head coach David Farrar and played their home games on campus at the Kibbie Dome in Moscow, Idaho.

In the regular season finale, Idaho defeated rival Boise State before 7,323 at the Kibbie Dome, the largest home attendance in 

They met Long Beach State in the first round of the conference tournament and lost by

Postseason result

|-
!colspan=6 style=| Big West tournament

References

External links
Sports Reference – Idaho Vandals: 1998–99 basketball season
Gem of the Mountains: 1999 University of Idaho yearbook – 1998–99 basketball season
Idaho Argonaut – student newspaper – 1999 editions

Idaho Vandals men's basketball seasons
Idaho
1999 in sports in Idaho
Idaho